King Baudouin is a Brussels Metro station and the western terminus of line 6 (formerly 1A). It is located in Laeken, in the north-west of the City of Brussels, Belgium, and serves the King Baudouin Stadium. It opened on 25 August 1998.

External links

Brussels metro stations
Railway stations opened in 1998
City of Brussels

1998 establishments in Belgium